Vërnicë (or Врбница) is a village in the former Trebisht Municipality in Dibër County in northeastern Albania. At the 2015 local government reform it became part of the municipality Bulqizë. It is situated with in the Gollobordë region, near the border with North Macedonia.

History
A demographic survey of the population of the village, done in 1873, recorded the village as having 30 households with 97 male Bulgarian Christian residents.

In 1900, Vasil Kanchov gathered and compiled statistics on demographics in the area and reported that the village of Varbnitsa was inhabited by about 300 Bulgarian Christians. The "La Macédoine et sa Population Chrétienne" survey by Dimitar Mishev (D. Brankov) concluded that the village was inhabited by 256 Bulgarian Exarchists. There was a Bulgarian school in the beginning of 20th century in Varbnitza.

During the Balkan Wars, two men from the village joined the Macedonian-Adrianopolitan Volunteer Corps.

Elez Koçi was killed in the village in 1916 by Bulgarian forces.

In 1939, on behalf of 40 Bulgarian houses in Varbitsa Kuzman Strezov signed a request by the local Bulgarians to the Bulgarian tsaritsa Giovanna requesting her intervention for the protection of the Bulgarian people in Albania - at that time an Italian protectorate.

According to some sources instruction in Macedonian was permitted in Vërnicë during the late 1940s.

Demographics
The village of Vërnicë is inhabited by an Albanian population which dominates demographically in the village.
Other inhabitants of Vërnicë are speakers of a south Slavic language (Macedonian) and the village has also traditionally contained a Macedonian Muslim (Torbeš) population.

According to a 2007 estimate, Vërnicë's population was 548.

References

Populated places in Bulqizë
Villages in Dibër County